Kurds in Palestine (: Akrad Filisteen) are Palestinians who are of Kurdish ancestry.

History

The origins of some Palestinian Kurds can be traced to the era of conquests of Kurdish Ayyubid dynasty during the Crusades. The Ayyubid rulers settled many Kurdish tribes in Palestine in order to secure the borders of their empire. Among the major settlements with Kurdish communities in Palestine are city of Hebron (al-Khalil), Jerusalem (al-Quds) and Shechem (Nablus).

There are also many Kurdish clans who came to Palestine at post-Ayyubid periods, especially under the Ottomans.  The Kurds are the largest ethnic minority in the West Bank.

Hebron
The Kurdish Muslim Saladin retook Hebron in 1187 – again with Jewish assistance according to one late tradition, in exchange for a letter of security allowing them to return to the city and build a synagogue there. The name of the city was changed back to Al-Khalil. A Kurdish quarter still existed in the town during the early period of Ottoman rule. Richard the Lionheart retook the city soon after. Richard of Cornwall, brought from England to settle the dangerous feuding between Templars and Hospitallers, whose rivalry imperiled the treaty guaranteeing regional stability stipulated with the Egyptian Sultan As-Salih Ayyub, managed to impose peace on the area. But soon after his departure, feuding broke out and in 1241 the Templars mounted a damaging raid on what was, by now, Muslim Hebron, in violation of agreements.

Some claim that as much as one third of inhabitants of Hebron are of Kurdish origin, where they have had their own quarters, such as Harat al-Akrad.

Notable people
 Ghassan Kanafani

See also
Ayyubids
Kurds in Jordan
Kurds in Israel

References

External links

Asian diaspora in the State of Palestine
Kurdish diaspora